Christopher William Richmond (12 July 1821 – 3 August 1895), generally called William Richmond, was a 19th-century New Zealand politician. He held a number of Cabinet positions between 1856 and 1861. He worked as a lawyer and was appointed a senior judge.

Early life
Richmond was probably born in London on 12 July 1821. His father, Christopher Richmond, died when William Richmond was only ten years old, leaving William in the sole care of Maria (Lely) Wilson, his mother. He was raised in the Unitarian faith, and attended Unitarian schools. His health was always delicate, and he suffered from severe asthma throughout his life. From 1841 to 1843, he was in France, but in 1844, he began working in various law offices. He also developed a strong friendship with Richard Holt Hutton, a writer and theologian who influenced his views considerably.

Emigration to New Zealand
Richmond became a practising lawyer in 1847, but business was poor. James Crowe Richmond and Henry Richmond, his two younger brothers, sought better fortunes in New Plymouth, New Zealand, in 1850, and William Richmond considered joining them. On 15 September 1852, Richmond married Emily Elizabeth Atkinson, described by Joseph Hutton (father of Richmond's friend Richard Holt Hutton) as "a remarkable woman of singular intellectual power, moral earnestness and charming spontaneity of character". Shortly after their marriage, the two set out for New Zealand on the  Sir Edward Paget, being joined by his mother, his sister, and Harry and Arthur Atkinson (two brothers of Emily; Harry would later become Premier). In New Plymouth, Richmond re-established his law practice, and soon became a prominent member of the local community.

Political career

 

On 5 November 1855, he was elected to represent the Town of New Plymouth electorate in the 2nd New Zealand Parliament. When Edward Stafford formed a government on 2 June 1856, Richmond accepted an invitation to become Colonial Secretary (forerunner to the modern Minister of Internal Affairs). When Henry Sewell resigned, Richmond also became Colonial Treasurer (forerunner to the modern Minister of Finance), although Sewell briefly resumed this post for two months in 1859. On 27 August 1858, he became New Zealand's first Minister for Native Affairs, but lost this post to Frederick Weld in late 1860. He also served as Commissioner of Customs.

Politically, Richmond aligned himself with the centralist faction, believing that the power of the provinces needed to be curtailed. Richmond also believed in the need to "reform" Māori institutions and culture, being particularly adamant about the need to eliminate the beastly communism of common land ownership. Richmond generally had a very low opinion of Māori, considering them to be savages.

He was confirmed at the 1860 general election, which was held on 28 November. After the Stafford government fell, Richmond did not remain in Parliament for long, and he resigned on 20 January 1862. He was succeeded by Isaac Newton Watt.

Legal career
He established a law practice in Dunedin with Thomas Gillies, a fellow MP. He was soon appointed to a post as a senior judge, a role which he seemed to enjoy more than his former political career. In 1865, he turned down an invitation by Stafford to return to politics, despite a suggestion that he could become Premier.

During the "Barton Affair" of 1876–78 he was a member of the court with Chief Justice James Prendergast who imprisoned lawyer George Elliott Barton for a month for contempt of court, a ruling that split the Wellington legal profession.

Towards the end of his life, Richmond became increasingly conservative, condemning the Liberal Party's proposals for women's suffrage, a land tax, and an income tax.

Family and death
The Richmonds had five daughters and four sons. Their daughter Margaret married the surgeon Walter Fell in 1886. Richmond died in Wellington on 3 August 1895.

References

1821 births
1895 deaths
New Zealand finance ministers
Members of the New Zealand House of Representatives
Members of the Cabinet of New Zealand
People from New Plymouth
Lawyers from Dunedin
High Court of New Zealand judges
English emigrants to New Zealand
New Zealand MPs for North Island electorates
Atkinson–Hursthouse–Richmond family
Colony of New Zealand judges
19th-century New Zealand politicians
Colonial Secretaries of New Zealand
Politicians from Dunedin
Fell family